

The battle 

In 1928, the Battle of Al-Regeai (Arabic: معركة الرقعي), took place and was considered the last military battle in Kuwait's early history. The battle took place in January during the reign of His Highness the 10th Ruler of Kuwait Sheikh Ahmad Al-Jaber Al-Sabah. In this battle, vehicles were used for the first time in Kuwait warfare. The battle was brought to effect by a raid of the Ikhwan group on a number of Kuwaitis who were farming in an area designated "Umm Al-Ruweisat", located in the northwest of Al Jahra. The Ikhwan force which consisted of some five hundred horsemen seized their farms.

The news reached Kuwait City and prompted the Battle General Commander of Defense and Security Forces, Sheikh Ali Salim Al-Mubarak Al-Sabah to form an army commanded by Sheikhs Ali Khalifa Al-Abdullah II Al-Sabah, Salman Al-Humoud Al-Sabah, Abdullah Jaber Al-Abdullah II Al-Sabah, Abdullah Ahmad Al-Jaber Al-Sabah, Sabah Al-Nasser and Ibrahim Abdullah Al-Muzayan. Vehicle armed men from Al-Jahra and Kuwait city joined the battle formation contingent led by Sheikh Ali Al-Salem Al-Sabah.

The assaulters were chased to Al-Batin valley, west of Al-Jahra and were cut off there. Forces of the "Al-Kout Fortress" led by Sheikh Ali Al-Salem Al-Sabah fought the Ikhwan group and inflicted heavy casualties on the assaulters forcing them to retreat from the assaulted farming areas. During the battle, some of the men of were charging with the cavalry and others were battling out of their respective vehicles. As time passed, vehicles ran out of fuel, ammunition and were sinking in the sand. In the meantime, Sheikh Ali Khalifa Al-Abdullah II Al-Sabah was injured in the leg and remained in the valley attaining the injured.

As time passed, Sheikh Abdullah Jaber Al-Abdullah II Al-Sabah, led the cavalry on a mission to locate and rescue Sheikh Ali Al-Salem Al-Sabah and his soldiers. To the disappointment, the vehicle of Sheikh Ali Al-Salem Al-Sabah was found stuck and raided.

Following the demise of Sheikh Ali Al-Salem Al-Sabah, the Emir of Kuwait Sheikh Ahmad Al-Jaber Al-Sabah ordered that defense cavalry and infantry in Al-Jahra outside the defensive wall of Kuwait fall under the command of Sheikh Abdullah Jaber Al-Abdullah II Al-Sabah.

See also
 Military of Kuwait

References

Battles involving Kuwait
Conflicts in 1928
History of Kuwait